Grand Rabbi Yaakov Aryeh Guterman (1792-1874) was the founding admor of the Radzymin Hasidic Dynasty. He was called the "Sabba Kadisha (Holy Grandfather) of Radzymin".

Biography
Rabbi Yaakov Aryeh Guterman was a disciple of the Seer of Lublin, the Maggid of Kozhnitz, the Yid Hakodosh, Rabbi Simcha Bunim of Peshischa and Rabbi Yitzchok of Vurka. In 1848, after the death of Rabbi Yitzchok of Vurka, Rabbi Gutterman became the founding admor of the Radzymin Hasidic Dynasty. He was revered as a miracle worker and was famous for inscribing hand written amulets that portended good tidings for their holders.

Works
 Bikurei Aviv, a commentary on the Torah
 Divrei Aviv  a commentary on Genesis Rabbah
 Likutei Aviv

Notable Descendents Who Were Named After Him
 Grand Rabbi Yaakov Aryeh Alter of Ger
 Grand Rabbi Yaakov Aryeh Milikowsky of Amshinov

External Links
 At the Rebbe's Seder Table by Yerachmiel Tilles on Chabad.org.

References 

Jewish Polish history
Orthodox Judaism in Poland
1792 births
1874 deaths
People from Grójec County